...Of the Dark Light is the eighth studio album by American death metal band Suffocation, released on June 9, 2017, via Nuclear Blast. It is the band's first album to feature guitarist Charlie Errigo and drummer Eric Morotti, and their final album to feature original vocalist Frank Mullen. At 35 minutes and 17 seconds, this is the shortest Suffocation album.

Reception

...Of the Dark Light received generally favorable views from critics. At Metacritic (a review aggregator site which assigns a normalized rating out of 100 from music critics), based on 4 critics, the album has received a score of 72/100, which indicates "generally favorable" reviews.

Track listing

Personnel
Credits are adapted from the album's liner notes.

Suffocation
 Frank Mullen – vocals
 Terrance Hobbs – lead guitar
 Charlie Errigo – rhythm guitar
 Derek Boyer – bass
 Eric Morotti – drums

Additional musicians
 Kevin Muller – backing vocals

Production
 Joe Cincotta – production, engineering
 Chris "Zeuss" Harris – mixing, mastering
 Colin Marks – artwork, design

Charts

References 

Suffocation (band) albums
2017 albums
Nuclear Blast albums